Mulghar Union is an Union Parishad under Fakirhat Upazila of Bagerhat District in the division of Khulna, Bangladesh. It has an area of 48.25 km2 (18.63 sq mi) and a population of 18,640.

References

Unions of Fakirhat Upazila
Unions of Bagerhat District
Unions of Khulna Division